Jonathan Martin Champion (born 23 May 1965) is a British sports commentator currently working as the lead association football commentator for ESPN (US). Champion is a well-established and experienced commentator who has also worked for the BBC and ITV over the last 20 years. Champion currently covers the FA Cup for ESPN/ABC and the Premier League for Amazon Prime Video.

His late father David Champion was the deputy headmaster of the independent school Bootham School, York. Jon's commentaries can also be heard on the worldwide feed of many Premier League and League Cup matches worldwide.

Early life
Jonathan Martin Champion was born on 23 May 1965 in Harrogate, West Riding of Yorkshire.

BBC Sport
Champion joined BBC Sport in the late 1980s and worked as a football commentator on BBC Radio Five Live between 1992 and 1996. He worked alongside Alan Green, Mike Ingham, Ron Jones, Rob Hawthorne, and Jonathan Legard covering Premier League, FA Cup, League Cup, and Football League matches for the network. During this time, Champion commentated on the 1994 and 1996 First Division play-off Finals, and the 1996 UEFA Champions League Final between Juventus and Ajax. His fellow commentator on that evening was future ITV colleague Peter Drury.

In 1995, an opportunity arose to further Champion's career at the BBC. John Motson took a three-month break from his role as a commentator on Match of the Day, allowing Champion to be drafted in to cover. Champion spent the whole of the 1995–1996 season combining his Five Live duties with appearances as a commentator on Match of the Day. He was successful enough to move across to TV permanently the following season, after Clive Tyldesley left the BBC and rejoined ITV.

Champion spent five seasons between 1996 and 2001 as a full-time member of the BBC's commentary team, covering edited highlights of the Premier League and the FA Cup, in addition to occasional matches from the UEFA Cup. At the 1998 World Cup, Champion commentated on highlights of England's 2nd Round exit at the hands of Argentina. He also commentated on rugby league Challenge Cup games on BBC television, typically taking the televised Sunday game of each round with Ray French commentating on the Saturday game.

ITV Sport 
In the summer of 2000, ITV surprised the BBC with a successful bid for Premier League highlights. This kicked in from 2001 and left the BBC without any regular week-by-week football. Champion therefore moved to join ITV in 2001, and was a regular part of ITV's commentary team for the Premier League, League Cup, Football League, and the UEFA Champions League. He was loaned back to ITV for the 2010 FIFA World Cup and UEFA Euro 2012, usually working alongside his ESPN colleague Craig Burley. He returned to ITV Sport for the 2018 and 2022 FIFA World Cups, where he paired with Ally McCoist. The duo was one of the broadcast teams of commentators for Prime Video Sport's UK Premier League coverage.

Setanta and ESPN 
In 2007, ambitious new-boys Setanta Sports UK signed up Champion as their lead FA Premier League play-by-play announcer. Champion remained contracted to ITV but was loaned out to Setanta. For two seasons, he thus managed to combine his ITV duties with 'live' matches on Setanta. During the 2008–09 season, Champion was increasingly heard more on Setanta who had also secured rights to the FA Cup. In May 2009, Champion commentated on his first FA Cup Final.

Within a month, Setanta had gone into administration and were forced to relinquish their football rights. These were scooped up by the Disney-owned sports broadcaster ESPN, who rapidly established a brand new sports channel ESPN UK for the U.K. and Ireland and starting broadcasting Premier League football in August 2009. Champion was the natural choice as their lead play-by-play commentator and moved across from ITV permanently.He also commentates on the Europa League and the FA Cup in addition to being ESPN's lead Premier League commentator. On 14 May 2011, he commentated the FA Cup Final between Manchester City and Stoke City with Chris Waddle. He then was loaned back to ESPN for the 2014 FIFA World Cup and UEFA Euro 2016 alongside former Arsenal player Stewart Robson. Champion now part-time commentates for USMNT friendlies alongside Kasey Keller when lead commentator Ian Darke is not available. From 2019 to 2022 MLS seasons, Champion was named MLS on ESPN and USMNT lead play-by-play commentator and UEFA Euro 2020 #2 play-by-play announcer alongside lead color commentator Taylor Twellman. After ESPN/ABC lost MLS rights, he is their lead announcer for ESPN's coverage of the FA Cup and EFL Cup working alongside Stewart Robson or Danny Higginbotham.

TV credits
FA Cup Finals: 2009 (Setanta), 2011, 2012 and 2013 (ESPN UK), 2021, 2022, 2023 (ESPN US)
League Cup Finals: 2002, 2003, 2004, 2006, 2007, 2008 (all ITV), 2021, 2022, 2023 (ESPN)
Championship Play-off Final: 2005 (ITV), 2009 (ITV), 2021, 2022, 2023 (ESPN)
FIFA World Cup: 1998 (BBC), 2002 (ITV), 2006 (ITV), 2010 (ITV), 2014 (ABC/ESPN), 2018 (ITV), 2022 (ITV)
USMNT Friendlies: 2014–2022 (ESPN)
Premier League: 2007–2009 (Setanta), 2009–2013 (ESPN), 2013–2019, 2021–present (Premier League Productions), 2019–present (Prime Video UK), 2019 (BT Sport)
UEFA Champions League: 2001–2009 (ITV Sport), 2015–2019 (BT Sport)
UEFA Europa League: 2009–2019 (ESPN/BT Sport)
UEFA European Championship: 2000 (BBC), 2004 (ITV), 2008 (ITV), 2012 (ITV), 2016 (ESPN), 2020 (ABC/ESPN)
UEFA Nations League: 2018–2021 (ABC/ESPN)
MLS: 2019–2022 (ABC/ESPN)

Other media
Champion was the commentator for the first time in the Pro Evolution Soccer series from Pro Evolution Soccer 2008 to Pro Evolution Soccer 2015. He worked alongside analyst and former Irish international Mark Lawrenson from Pro Evolution Soccer 2008 to Pro Evolution Soccer 2010. From Pro Evolution Soccer 2011 to Pro Evolution Soccer 2015, he worked together with analyst from ITV, Jim Beglin. He was then replaced by Peter Drury as the commentator for Pro Evolution Soccer 2016.

World Cup
Champion was selected as a commentator for ITV at the 2010 World Cup in South Africa. For the 2014 FIFA World Cup in Brazil he commentated for ESPN/ABC's coverage in the U.S. During the 2018 and 2022 tournaments, he was praised for his commentary partnership with Ally McCoist.

Personal life
Champion is a supporter of York City F.C.

References

External links

1965 births
Living people
People from Harrogate
British reporters and correspondents
English television presenters
English rugby union commentators
Association football commentators
Alumni of Leeds Trinity University
Major League Soccer broadcasters
English association football commentators